St or St. Cecilia's Abbey may refer to:
St Cecilia's Abbey, Ryde, abbey of Benedictine nuns on the Isle of Wight, England
Appley House, the house occupied by the abbey
St. Cecilia's Abbey, Solesmes, abbey of Benedictine nuns in France